Joseph Thomas Morton Jr. (born October 18, 1947) is an American stage, television and film actor. He has worked with film director John Sayles in The Brother from Another Planet (1984), City of Hope (1991) and Lone Star (1996). Other films he has appeared in include Terminator 2: Judgment Day (1991), Of Mice and Men (1992), Speed (1994), Apt Pupil (1998), Blues Brothers 2000 (1998), What Lies Beneath (2000), Ali (2001), Paycheck (2003), Stealth (2005), American Gangster (2007), Batman v Superman: Dawn of Justice (2016), Justice League (2017), and Zack Snyder's Justice League (2021).

His television work includes his role as Eli Pope, Olivia Pope's father, in Scandal, for which he won the Primetime Emmy Award for Outstanding Guest Actor in a Drama Series in 2014, and the role of Henry Deacon on the TV series Eureka.

In 2019, Morton narrated the Audible .com program, The Water Dancer, by Ta-Nehisi Coates.

Early life
Morton was born in Harlem, the son of Evelyn, a secretary, and Joseph Thomas Morton Sr., a U.S. Army intelligence officer. Because of his father's military service, he spent parts of his childhood in West Germany and Okinawa. When Morton was 10 years old, his father died.

Morton graduated from Andrew Jackson High School and studied drama at Hofstra University.

Career
Morton made his Broadway debut in Hair, appeared in Salvation, and was nominated for a Tony Award for Raisin. He has appeared in over 70 films, including John Sayles' The Brother from Another Planet (as The Brother), Terminator 2: Judgment Day (as Dr. Miles Bennett Dyson) and Blues Brothers 2000 (as Cabel "Cab" Chamberlain, based upon the late Cab Calloway). He also played Police Lieutenant Herb "Mac" McMahon, in Speed. On daytime, Morton has had roles on Search for Tomorrow (Dr. James Foster, 1973–74), Another World (Dr. Abel Marsh and Leo Mars, 1983–84), and All My Children (Dr. Zeke McMillan, 2002). In 2002, he appeared on the London stage in the play Art.

Morton has made many notable TV guest appearances, including his appearances as Dr. Steven Hamilton in the first two seasons of Smallville. He starred in the Sanford and Son spin-off Grady (1975–76), M*A*S*H* (battalion aid surgeon Capt. Nick Saunders, 1976), Under One Roof (1995) and E-Ring (2005). He portrayed the jack-of-all-trades scientist Henry Deacon as a regular on Syfy Channel's Eureka (2006–12). Morton played the role of Eli Pope on the hit drama Scandal, a role for which he received the Primetime Emmy Award for Outstanding Guest Actor in a Drama Series.

In 2016, Morton portrayed the activist and comedian Dick Gregory in the play Turn Me Loose at the Westside Theatre in Manhattan. Morton portrayed Dr. Silas Stone, father of Victor Stone/Cyborg, in a cameo role in the 2016 film Batman v Superman: Dawn of Justice, part of the DC Extended Universe. He reprised the character in the film Justice League (2017) and more extensively in its director's cut.

From 2018 to 2020, Morton co-starred as Reverend Arthur Finer in the CBS series God Friended Me. Morton directed three episodes of God Friended Me, and has directing credits for four other TV series.

Filmography

Film

Television

Radio

Video games

Awards and nominations

References

External links

 
 
 
 
 Joe Morton sings "The Devil's Lonely Fire" from Badland.

1947 births
Living people
African-American male actors
American male film actors
American male stage actors
American male television actors
Audiobook narrators
Hofstra University alumni
Male actors from New York City
People from Harlem
20th-century American male actors
21st-century American male actors
The Blues Brothers members
Andrew Jackson High School (Queens) alumni